Oberea atricilla is a species of flat-faced longhorn beetle in the tribe Saperdini in the genus Oberea, discovered by Fairmaire in 1893.

References

A
Beetles described in 1893